Diky Greben is a lava dome complex located in the southern part of Kamchatka Peninsula, Russia. Kurile Lake caldera is located immediately to the east.

See also
List of volcanoes in Russia

References 
 

Volcanoes of the Kamchatka Peninsula
Holocene lava domes
Mountains of the Kamchatka Peninsula
Holocene Asia